Louis (Luis) Fatio Pacheco (December 26, 1800 – ?) was an Afro-Spanish enslaved person who became known in 19th century Spanish Florida for his connection to the Black Seminole community.

Biography

Early life and career 
Pacheco was born December 26,1800 in New Switzerland on the plantation of Francis Philip Fatio Sr.—an associate and possibly a partner in Panton, Leslie, & Company. Pacheco's father Adam was a skilled slave working a lot with his hands as a carpenter, building boats, and driver. He was also noted to be a "very intelligent and ambitious man." 

With Pacheco's father working as a sought after slave, Pacheco received some privilege's allowing him to learn how to read and write. This is where he skill for learning multiple languages developed by the time he reached adulthood he knew French, Spanish, and English. Pacheco learned the Seminole language from his brother who was kidnapped by the Indians but was later returned to the plantation.  In 1811 Francis Fatio Sr died leaving his property and slaves to his son Francis Fatio Jr.

In 1821, Luis married an enslaved woman named Ramon Sanchez. She purchased her freedom for 300 pesos. He would leave the Fatio plantation often to see his wife. Luis would often get into trouble for not informing his master when he would go to see his wife. In 1824 Luis Fatio and Francis Fatio Jr had a falling out though no one is certain about it. Luis ran away from the plantation near Charlotte Harbor, working with the Spanish fisheries. 

Luis was captured and returned to Fort Brooke between 1829 to 1831. Luis had been sold to four different people until he was sold to Antonio Pacheco, a Cuban who ran a business that he believed Fatio would be able to assist him. After the death of Antonio Pacheco, his wife loaned him out to the military to help as an interpreter to the Seminole Indians.

Dade battle 
According to the Seminole leader Alligator, the Dade battle began at 10:00 a.m., but according to survivor Private Ransom Clark, it started at 8 a.m. and ended around 4 p.m., with the Indians leaving around sunset. The battle (often called the Dade massacre) was an 1835 military defeat for the United States Army. The U.S. attempted to force the Seminoles to move away from their land in Florida and relocate to Oklahoma Indian Territory. Instead, under the command of Major Francis L. Dade, consisting of 110 soldiers were ambushed by 180 Seminole warriors. Of the three U.S. soldiers who survived, Louis Fatio Pacheco was suspected of being an informant and spent the rest of his life trying to clear his name. After Major Dade was shot, Pacheco dropped to the ground swiftly that those surrounding believed he was shot in the head. After noticing him crawling for cover caused suspicion throughout the military believing Pacheco was expecting the ambush to occur. 

Pacheco was found by the Seminoles was found hiding behind a tree many he was threatened many times while held captive but he was always protected it was mentioned "That's a black man, he is not his own master. Don't kill him!." Pacheco repaid his captors by reading the letters and dispatches found on the bodies of dead officers. This gave the Seminoles valuable information pertaining to the military's strategy. In 1837, he escaped the Indians and turned himself into the authorities hoping to clear his name.

Incarceration and re-enslavement 
In 1837, Luis turned himself to the authorities seeking to clear his name. The man overseeing Luis's case later forgot about him and sent him to New Orleans with other Black Seminoles. Once they arrived in New Orleans, Luis sat in prison for a month; once released, he, along with the other Black Seminoles, was set free. In 1845 Marcellus Duval and his brother attempted to obtain all of the Black Seminoles set free in New Orleans, including Luis Fatio Pacheco. After being captured by the Duval brothers, he was enslaved to them until 1865, when slavery ended.

Later life and death 
At the age of 82, Luis traveled back to Florida to see his former slave owner. When he arrived in Jacksonville, he met with Susan Philippa Fatio L'Engle. Luis must have divulged things about her family that no one else would know because nearly 60 years had passed since working on her family's plantation, and she welcomed Luis. Luis stayed with her until he died at the age of 94 years old.

References 
https://www.orlandosentinel.com/news/os-xpm-2000-03-12-0003110318-story.html

Further reading 
The Seminoles of Florida by Minnie Moore-Wilson 
The Black Seminoles History of a Freedom-Seeking People 
Laumer, Frank (1995) Dade's Last Command. University Press of Florida. ISBN 0-8130-1324-0
Mahon, John K. (1992) History of the Second Seminole War 1835-1842. University of Florida Press. P. 106. ISBN 0-8130-1097-7

External links 
The Dade Massacre • Florida Historical Society Quarterly 5:123‑138. (2022). Uchicago.edu. https://penelope.uchicago.edu/Thayer/E/Gazetteer/Places/America/United_States/Florida/_Texts/FHSQ/5/3/Dade_Massacre*.html
The American Monthly Magazine. (2013). Google Books. https://books.google.co.uk/books?id=V1pFAAAAYAAJ&pg=PA103&lpg=PA103&dq=The+loss+of+the+enemy+must+have+been+very+great,+because+we+never+fired+until+we+fixed+on+our+men;+but+the+cannon+was+necessarily+fired+at+random,+as+only+two+or+three+Indians+appeared+together.&source=bl&ots=gxTnHu_Ij9&sig=1_upm7-FZ5BHMPDGd2F8moXqP6c&hl=en&sa=X&ved=0ahUKEwjRi9eV-vzTAhVIKMAKHRRMC8UQ6AEIJzAA#v=onepage&q=The%20loss%20of%20the%20enemy%20must%20have%20been%20very%20great%2C%20because%20we%20never%20fired%20until%20we%20fixed%20on%20our%20men%3B%20but%20the%20cannon%20was%20necessarily%20fired%20at%20random%2C%20as%20only%20two%20or%20three%20Indians%20appeared%20together.&f=false

19th-century American slaves